Private Arrangements is the debut historical romance by Sherry Thomas.

Literary reception

Thomas' debut garnered the Romantic Times Reviewers Choice Award for Best First Historical Romance, giving it 4 1/2 stars saying, "Thomas makes a dazzling debut with a beautifully written, sizzling, captivating love story. She cleverly moves from past to present, keeping readers turning the pages with sexy interludes and intriguing secrets. Her compelling tale of love betrayed and then reborn will make you sigh with pleasure."

Publishers Weekly gave it a starred review saying, "Thomas propels the plot forward with revealing repartee and gives the leads real nuance. Intelligent and forthright with honorable hidden qualities, Lady Tremaine makes an exceptional heroine, and her deceptions are believably attributed to a desire for self-preservation in a sexist society. The results are steamy and smart." Publishers Weekly went on to name it one of the best books of 2008, saying, "Deft plotting and sparkling characterization mark this superior debut historical romance."

The Historical Novel Society said Thomas "created a delightful story with a well-developed plot, balanced with the right amount of historical detail. Her characters are complex, and the emotional conflict is believable."

Awards

 2008: Romantic Times Reviewers Choice Award First Historical Romance for Private Arrangements
 2008: Publishers Weekly Best Books of 2008 for Private Arrangements

References

2008 novels
Historical romance novels
American romance novels